Michel Andrieux (born 28 April 1967) is a French competition rower and Olympic champion.

Andrieux won a gold medal in coxless pairs at the 2000 Summer Olympics.

References

People from Bergerac, Dordogne
1967 births
French male rowers
Olympic rowers of France
Rowers at the 1992 Summer Olympics
Rowers at the 1996 Summer Olympics
Rowers at the 2000 Summer Olympics
Olympic gold medalists for France
Olympic bronze medalists for France
Living people
Olympic medalists in rowing
Medalists at the 2000 Summer Olympics
Medalists at the 1996 Summer Olympics
World Rowing Championships medalists for France
Sportspeople from Dordogne
20th-century French people
21st-century French people